China Grill Management is a restaurant group which owns and operates over 22 restaurants worldwide under 15 concepts worldwide. Headquartered in Florida, the group now has locations in Miami, Los Angeles, Las Vegas, Ft. Lauderdale, Chicago, Atlantic City, London and Mexico City. China Grill Management was established in 1987 by Jeffrey Chodorow. The first location was China Grill in Midtown West Manhattan. All restaurants are located in major cities, many of which are in hotels. The most notable concepts are Asia de Cuba and China Grill.

Restaurants & bars

Asia de Cuba
Asian-Latin cuisine
London: at St. Martins Lane
Miami: at Mondrian South Beach
Los Angeles, California: at Mondrian Los Angeles; Designed by Philippe Starck

China Grill
Asian-inspired World Cuisine
Miami: Brickell, 801 Brickell Avenue
Mexico City:  at Camino Real Hotel; Also features the Moonbar
New York City: Midtown West, Manhattan (at the CBS Building); CGM's first location.

Red Square
International cuisine with a Russian Flair
Las Vegas: at Mandalay Bay Hotel

Other restaurants

London
Light Bar at St Martins Lane: Philippe Starck design
Purple Bar & Long Bar at Sanderson: Philippe Starck design
Suka: at the Sanderson Hotel; Modern Malaysian cuisine
Miami
Biscayne Tavern
New York City
Ed's Chowder House: at The Empire Hotel; East Coast Seafood cuisine
plunge Rooftop Bar + Lounge: at Gansevoort Meatpacking
The Empire Hotel Rooftop: at The Empire Hotel
East & West at YOTEL New York

Awards and accolades
Asia de Cuba LA: Zagat Best LA Décor Restaurants 
Asia de Cuba LA: Zagat Best Los Angeles Caribbean/Cuban Restaurants 
Asia de Cuba Miami: Miami New Times Best Restaurant for Cocktails 2009 
Bar Basque: New York Magazine Where to Eat 2011 
Bar Basque: 2011 Zagat Survey Best New York City Hot Spots 
Blue Door Fish: 2011 Miami New Times Best Seafood on the Beach
 China Grill New York: Zagat Survey Best New York City Power Lunch Restaurants 
China Grill New York: Zagat Survey Best New York City Asian Restaurants 
China Grill Miami Beach: Zagat Survey Best Pan-Asian Restaurants 
Ed's Chowder House: New York Magazine Where to Eat 2010 
The Empire Hotel Rooftop: Travel and Leisure The Hottest Hotel Rooftop Bars 2009
Plunge: ABC News World's Best Rooftop Bars 2010

References

External links
China Grill Management
China Grill Management on Facebook
China Grill Management on Twitter

Restaurants in Manhattan
Companies based in New York City
Restaurants established in 1987